Deepak Pandya (6 December 1932 - 4 October 2020) was a neuroanatomist who is best known for his contributions to the understanding of cortical and subcortical brain connectivity in the macaque using tract-tracing methods. He is the father of NASA astronaut Sunita Williams.

Early life and career
He was born at Jhulasan, Mehsana District, Gujarat in India. He was orphaned but completed his I.S. in 1953 from Gujarat University in India. After obtaining his M.D. degree from Gujarat University in 1957 (and interning in V.S. Hospital in Junagadh till 1958), he went to the United States and did his internship and residency training in Medicine in Cleveland, Ohio. He was then married to Slovene American Ursuline Bonnie (Zalokar) Pandya, who resides in Falmouth, Massachusetts.

In 1964, Pandya joined the Department of Anatomy at Case Western Reserve University, as a postdoctoral fellow. He moved to Boston in 1966 and joined the Aphasia Research Center at the Boston Veterans Administration Medical Center, and the Departments of Anatomy and Neurology at Boston University School of Medicine as an Assistant Professor. During his postdoctoral fellowship and subsequent period in Boston, Pandya focused his research investigations on cortico-cortical connections. In 1969 his laboratory moved to Boston City Hospital. During this time he was appointed a lecturer in Experimental Neuropathology at Harvard Medical School, and he participated in teaching the Neuroscience course at both schools. In 1973, Pandya joined the Veterans Administration Medical Center in Bedford, Massachusetts, as a staff internist.  He practiced clinical medicine while continuing his research studies and teaching, until his retirement in 1995. After this, Pandya moved his office to the Department of Anatomy & Neurobiology at Boston University School of Medicine.

Contributions and research 
Pandya, along with many colleagues, has made significant contributions in the field of connectivity of cerebral cortex. Several postdoctoral and Ph.D. students have received training under Pandya. His research works have been internationally recognized and he has presented his work at conferences in North America and Europe. He was continuing his research studies on comparative brain architectonics in the monkey and humans, as well as connectional studies in the monkey.

Pandya and his Slovenian American wife, Bonnie, are the parents of NASA astronaut Sunita Williams.

Notes

Indian emigrants to the United States
1932 births
2020 deaths
Case Western Reserve University faculty
Harvard Medical School faculty
Boston University faculty
Gujarat University alumni
People from Mehsana district
American people of Gujarati descent